Patrick Geoffrey Ryecart (born 9 May 1952) is an English actor.

Early life and career
Ryecart was born in Warwick, Warwickshire.

His first West End appearance was in Bernard Shaw's Candida at the Albery Theatre, playing the young poet Marchbanks opposite Deborah Kerr, directed by Michael Blakemore. Among a string of fine reviews, Bernard Levin in the Sunday Times described his performance as "supernova" and that he had not seen "such a talent in embryo since the young Richard Burton". Ryecart has continued working in theatre, television and film (his last film role Lord Wigram in The King's Speech) with lead roles in the classics of Shaw, Sheridan, and Shakespeare to light comedies, TV situation comedy, thrillers and musicals. Among his notable credits in London are Jack Absolute in The Rivals, with Michael Hordern as his father and Geraldine McEwan as Mrs Malaprop, and Lord Goring in Peter Hall's An Ideal Husband. He has acted on many British television shows since the mid-1970s including Lillie, Romeo and Juliet, The Professionals, Minder(Se7ep5), Rumpole of the Bailey, Lovejoy, Coming Home and Holby City. In 1986 he appeared in the Doctor Who serial The Trial of a Time Lord in the Mindwarp segment. He was one of the lead characters in the BBC TV comedy series The High Life playing Captain Hilary Duff.  He played Hugo Latimer in the BBC series Trainer. He played Mr. Crane-Bolder in Catherine Cookson’s Rag Nymph a TV Mini-Series (1997). He also appeared in the 1996 Agatha Christie's Poirot episode, "Dumb Witness" as Charles and for the BBC in My Son My Son. He appeared in Midsomer Murders "The Night of the Stag" as Anthony Devereux (2011). In 2013 he played Sir Anthony Morgan in Agatha Christie’s Poirot "The Labours of Hercules". Also Dalziel & Pascoe episode and many mini series for the U.S. He played Sir Hugh Bodrugan in the 2015 BBC series of Poldark. In 2016, he played the role of the Duke of Norfolk in the Netflix series The Crown.

His extensive theatre credits include The Beastly Beatitudes of Balthazar B by J P Donleavy in London's West End, which he also produced, first playing Balthazar to Simon Callow's playing Beefy, (who was later replaced by Billy Connolly). Numerous tours include "Donkeys Years", "Rebecca", "Tunes of Glory" and "The Millionairess" opposite Raquel Welch. He also produced, at the Garrick Theatre London (and later redirected for tour and the Edinburgh Festival 2011) "Jus' like That!" the highly successful affectionate tribute to the great Tommy Cooper, written by John Fisher.

His film credits include A Bridge Too Far (1977), Silver Dream Racer (1980), Arthur the King (1985), Prisoner of Honor (1991), Parting Shots (1999) and The King's Speech (2010).

Personal life
He was married to English actress Marsha Fitzalan, the third daughter of the late 17th Duke of Norfolk, from 4 July 1977 until their divorce in 1995. The couple met at drama school, The Webber Douglas Academy.  They have three grown up children: Mariella Celia (born 1982), Jemima Carrie (born 1984), and Frederick William Hamlet (born 1987). The two elder children are both married. Ryecart lives in London.

Partial filmography
A Bridge Too Far (1977) - German Lieutenant
Silver Dream Racer (1980) - Benson
Silas Marner (1985) - Godfrey Cass
Tai-Pan (1986) - Captain Glessing
Goldeneye: The Secret Life of Ian Fleming (1989) - Ivar Bryce
Arms and The Man (1989) - Sergius Seranoff
Twenty-One (1991) - Jack
Prisoner of Honor (1991) - Maj. Esterhazy
Parting Shots (1999) - Cleverley
The King's Speech (2010) - Lord Wigram
Showreel (2011) - Gilbert
Candle to Water (2012) - Cy
The Contract (2016) - Greg
The Crown (2017-2019) - The Duke of Norfolk

External links

English male stage actors
English male television actors
1952 births
Living people
English male film actors
Alumni of the College of the Venerable Bede, Durham
Male actors from Warwickshire
People from Warwick